Albert Emmanuel Abreu Díaz (born September 26, 1995) is a Dominican professional baseball pitcher for the New York Yankees of Major League Baseball (MLB). He made his MLB debut with the Yankees in 2020 and has also played in MLB for the Texas Rangers and Kansas City Royals.

Career

Houston Astros
Abreu signed with the Houston Astros as an international free agent in August 2013. He made his professional debut in 2014 with the Dominican Summer League Astros where he had a 3–2 win–loss record with a 2.78 earned run average (ERA) in 14 games. He pitched 2015 with the Greeneville Astros, going 2–3 with a 2.51 ERA and started 2016 with the Quad Cities River Bandits, where he posted a 2–8 record and 3.50 ERA before being promoted to the Lancaster JetHawks where he finished the season, going 1–0 with a 5.40 ERA in three games.

New York Yankees
On November 17, 2016, the Astros traded Abreu and Jorge Guzmán to the New York Yankees for Brian McCann. He spent 2017 with the Charleston RiverDogs, Tampa Yankees and GCL Yankees, posting a combined 2–3 record and 3.38 ERA in  innings pitched between the three clubs. The Yankees added him to their 40-man roster after the 2017 season.

Abreu made his MLB debut on August 8, 2020.

Texas Rangers
On April 2, 2022, the Yankees traded Abreu and Robert Ahlstrom to the Texas Rangers for catcher Jose Trevino. The Rangers designated Abreu for assignment on May 30.

Kansas City Royals
On June 2, 2022, the Rangers traded Abreu to the Kansas City Royals for Yohanse Morel. The Royals designated Abreu for assignment on June 17, 2022.

New York Yankees (second stint)
The New York Yankees claimed Abreu off of waivers on June 21, 2022.

References

External links

1995 births
Living people
Charleston RiverDogs players
Dominican Republic expatriate baseball players in the United States
Dominican Summer League Astros players
Greeneville Astros players
Gulf Coast Yankees players
Kansas City Royals players
Lancaster JetHawks players
Major League Baseball pitchers
Major League Baseball players from the Dominican Republic
New York Yankees players
People from Monte Cristi Province
Quad Cities River Bandits players
Round Rock Express players
Scottsdale Scorpions players
Tampa Tarpons players
Tampa Yankees players
Texas Rangers players
Tigres del Licey players
Trenton Thunder players